Victor Steinbrueck Park is a 0.8 acre (3,000 m²) park in Downtown Seattle, Washington, United States, located just northwest of Pike Place Market overlooking Elliott Bay. Named for the Seattle-based architect Victor Steinbrueck, it is positioned between Western Avenue and the Alaskan Way Viaduct at the foot of Virginia Street.

History
The park overlaps the former site of the Washington National Guard Armory, which was originally built around 1909 and damaged by fire in 1962 at a time when the future of the Market itself was a contentious issue. It was eventually torn down in 1968. Victor Steinbrueck, who was instrumental in the preservation of nearby Pike Place Market and Pioneer Square, wrote of the location in 1968: "One of the grandest downtown lookout places is at Western Avenue where it meets Pike Place and Virginia Street. It has been neglected by the city and its possibilities for enjoyment are ignored except by a few habitués and passing pedestrians." Steinbrueck was strongly opposed to the demolition of the armory. "Buildings like this," he wrote, "(and there are very few) offer an irreplaceable tie with the past as well as adding variety and interest to new surroundings. Restoration is not at all impossible or difficult for sympathetic designers. Others can always find practical reasons for destruction."

The city purchased the land in 1968, demolished the remnant of the armory, and transferred ownership to the parks department in 1970. The park was landscaped in 1982 as Market Park. Two cedar totem poles, designed by Marvin Oliver and carved by James Bender, were added in 1984. After Steinbrueck's death in 1985, the park was renamed after him. His son Peter Steinbrueck, also an architect, would later serve on the Seattle City Council from 1997 to 2007. The totem poles, which do not have indigenous meaning or significance, may be removed.

In December 2022, the park is planned to close for a year-long renovation project to repair the waterproofing under the park, which had deteriorated and leaked water into the parking garage below. The project will also include new furnishings, a replacement pavilion, and upgraded lighting.

See also
 Farmer's Pole (1984)
 Untitled Totem Pole (1984)

References

External links
, Seattle Parks

Downtown Seattle
Parks in Seattle
Pike Place Market